Datastorm is a video game for the Amiga published by Visionary Design in 1989. Written by Søren Grønbech, it was inspired by the horizontally scrolling Defender arcade game and the Defender-like Dropzone originally released for the Atari 8-bit family.

Gameplay
Datastorm allows for a single player to play or two players to play simultaneously or one after the other. The game takes place on planets in a side scrolling format that wraps around with the player flying above in a spacecraft. The player must protect and rescue the 8 survival pods that roll around on the surface of the planet and take them to a warp gate. An onslaught of enemies try to destroy the spaceship so constantly destroying these enemies and their missiles is necessary. There is also a special type of enemy called an alien lander that captures the pods and whisks them away to the top of the level. In addition to standard enemies, there are also mother ships, which act as bosses within the game. These mother ships come in the form of a fleet of fast luminous ships, a large squid or a large skull.

A radar scanner, which is essentially a mini-map is presented along the bottom of the screen and gives a complete view of the entire planet to help keep track of what is going on. The game also features autosave, a highscore table, on-screen instructions and level select. In terms of weaponry, the ship has lasers, smart bombs, cloaking technology that makes it invincible for a period of time. The points increase for each level: on levels 5, 9, 13 and so on, the player gets a new set of eight and the scoring resets.

Plot 
The game takes place after the planet Xerxes exploded causing its 8 orbiting colonies to drift into deep space. The inhabitants of these colonies must locate a new home planet so they each send a survival pod out into space to achieve this mission.

Development
The game was announced in May 1989.

Reception

Julian Rignall, writing for Computer and Video Games in 1989, called Datastorm "the best shoot 'em up yet seen out of a coin-op cabinet." The overall review score was 95%.

References

External links
 Datastorm at Lemon Amiga

1989 video games
Amiga games
Amiga-only games
Horizontally scrolling shooters
Video games developed in Denmark